Dima Hasao district, earlier called North Cachar Hills district, is an administrative district in the state of Assam, India. As of 2011, it is the least populous district of Assam. 

Dima Hasao district is one of the two autonomous hill districts of the state of Assam. The district headquarters Haflong is the only hill station in Assam, a tourist destination, also nicknamed the Switzerland of the north-east.

Etymology
"Dima Hasao" means "Dimasa Hills" in the Dimasa language.

History
The earliest inhabitants of the present district were Mongoloid groups who preferred hilly terrain and practised their own culture, tradition and land rights, governing themselves as independent tribes. As per records of different British historians and officials, North Cachar Hills was already occupied by the Dimasa Kacharis, erstwhile old Kuki tribes viz. Biate, Hrangkhol, Hmar, Sakachep and Zeme Naga tribes, during the British Rule in India.

Medieval period
During the medieval period (1500–1854), Dima Hasao was part of the Dimasa Kachari Kingdom called the "Cachar Kingdom", with its capital at Maibang. The Dimasa Kingdom as per Ahom Buranji, stretched from the Kallang river in Nagaon to the Kapili river. This includes parts of Cachar and North Cachar (Dima Hasao), the districts of Hojai, Nagaon, Golaghat and Karbi Anglong of Assam and Dimapur district, in Nagaland.

Colonial period

In the colonial period, Khaspur in present-day Cachar district was the administrative centre. However an internal schism led to the division of the old Cachar Kingdom into North Kachar and South Kachar. The last Dimasa king, Govinda Chandra Hasnusa, assigned Kashi Chandra the hilly tract of Cachar i.e. roughly Dima Hasao (North Kachar Kingdom), for administrative purposes. Soon the latter declared its independence over the hilly portion. That led to the treacherous murder of Kashi Chandra by Raja Govinda Chandra Hasnusa. Incensed, the son of Kashi Chandra, Tularam,  incessantly created political turbulence, asserting his sovereignty over hilly portion of Cachar Kingdom. Finally, with British assistance, Tularam succeeded in carving North Cachar Hills from Cachar Kingdom. David Scott, agent to the British Raj in 1829 made an arrangement to recognise Tularam as the ruler of North Cachar (Dima Hasao).  In 1850s, Tularam died and the frequent Angami raids and a grave incident at Semkhor village paved the ground to extend British influence over North Cachar. In 1853, North Cachar was annexed and made part of the Nagaon district of British Assam as a subdivision.

In 1867, this sub-division was abolished and apportioned into three parts among the Cachar, Khasi and Jaintia Hills districts, and Nagaon. The present Dima Hasao district, or formerly North Cachar Hills district was included in the old Cachar district, with Asalu being only police outpost. In 1880, this portion was constituted into a sub-division with headquarters at Gunjung under Cachar district.

This headquarters was shifted to Haflong in 1895. Since then, Haflong has continued to be the headquarters. In 1951, after the adoption of the Indian constitution, North Cachar Hills ceased to be a part of Cachar district, as specified under paragraph 20 of the sixth schedule to the constitution. This part, along with Mikir Hills, constituted a new civil district named "United District of North Cachar and Mikir Hills", which went into effect on 17 November 1951. According to a provision of the sixth schedule, two different councils were later constituted, viz., North Cachar Hills District Council and Mikir Hills District Council. Within those geographical boundaries, North Cachar Hills District Council was inaugurated on 19 April 1952.

Since Independence
On 17 November 1951, Mikir Hills and North Cachar Hills District was created with area occupying present Dima Hasao district, Karbi Anglong and West Karbi Anglong district. On 2 February 1970, the government declared an independent administrative district, viz., North Cachar Hills District with the geographical boundary of autonomous North Cachar Hills district council. At present, this autonomous council possesses administrative control over almost all departments of the district except Law and Order, Administration, and Treasury department.

Administration
Dima Hasao comprises three subdivisions: (I) Haflong, (II) Maibang and (III) Diyungbra. The district consists of five Community Development Blocks: (I) Jatinga Valley Development Block, Mahur; (II) Diyung Valley Development Block, Maibang; (III) Harangajao ITD Block, Harangajao; (IV) Diyungbra ITD Block, Diyungmukh; and (V) New Sangbar Development Block, Sangbar. There is one municipality board viz. Haflong and three town committees in Dima Hasao viz. Mahur, Maibang and Umrangso and also mini-towns like Harangajao, Langting and Diyungbra.

Geography
The district headquarters are located at Haflong. It is the second-largest district of Assam after Karbi Anglong. Dima Hasao District is surrounded by Karbi Anglong district and Nagaland on the northeast, Manipur on the east, Hojai District to the north, West Karbi Anglong district on the northwest, Meghalaya on the west and Cachar district in the south.

Politics

Dima Hasao district is an autonomous district with Sixth Schedule status granted by the Constitution of India.  The Dima Hasao District is administered by North Cachar Hills Autonomous Council (DHADC). Members of the Autonomous Council (MAC) are elected by people of Dima Hasao. The Political party who has majority MACs form the ruling party. The Autonomous Council is a powerful body and almost all the department of government are under its control except the police and Law & Order is under Assam Government.

Economy
In 2006, the Indian government named Dima Hasao one of the country's 250 most backward districts (out of a total of 640). It is one of the eleven districts in Assam currently receiving funds from the Backward Regions Grant Fund Programme (BRGF).

Energy
Kopili HEP
Kopili Hydro Electric Project is a power project near Umrangso, involving two dams on Kopili river and Umrong nalla, a tributary of Kopili. There are two power stations as part of Kopili HEP, Khandong Stage I & II (75 MW) and Kopili Stage I & II (200 MW), with total output of 275 MW.

Demographics

Population
According to the 2011 census, Dima Hasao has a population of 214,102, roughly equal to the nation of Samoa. This gives it a ranking of 588th in India (out of a total of 640). Its population growth rate over the decade 2001-2011 was 13.53%. Dima Hasao has a sex ratio of 931 females for every 1000 males and a literacy rate of 78.99%.

Ethnic groups

Dima Hasao is one of the three hill districts in Assam with a tribal majority population, the others being Karbi Anglong and West Karbi Anglong. The tribal population in Dima Hasao accounts for about 70.92% of the total population of the district according to the 2011 census, the highest percentage in the state. Scheduled Castes are 2.02%. The major indigenous communities inhabiting the district are Dimasa Kachari, Karbi, Zeme Naga, Hmar, Biate and a number of minor indigenous communities including: Hrangkhol, Khasi-Pnars, Rongmei Naga, Khelma and Vaiphei. The Kuki, Hmar, Biate, Hrangkhol and Vaiphei language speakers belong to the Kuki-Chin ethnic group. Non-indigenous communities includes Kanrupi Bengali, Gorkha tribes, Deshwali tribes and few other communities who have made the district their home.

As per the language data, the largest non-tribal communities are Bengalis (25,264: change of -7.53% from 2001), Nepalis (13,615: +9.76%), Hindi speakers (9,926: +13.83%), Assamese speakers (4,057: -26.32%), Halam-Kuki/Khelma/Riam (1,940 : +15.41%), Bodo-Kachari (1,604 : -7.82%), Meitei (1,373 : -24.64%), Tripuri (527: -21.11%), and Bishnupriya (401: -14.32%).

As of the 2011 census, 67.07% of the population are Hindus, 29.57% Christians and 2.04% Muslims.

Languages

At the time of the 2011 census, 36.00% of the district spoke Dimasa, 14.00% Bengali, 10.00% Zeme, 8.00% Hmar, 6.00% Nepali, 5.00% Kuki, 5.00% Karbi, 3.00% Hindi, 2.00% Khasi and 2.00% Assamese as their first language.

Dimasa and Haflong Hindi (a speech form of Hindi) and Bengali are the main lingua franca in the Dima Hasao.

Culture

Dima Hasao District is a land of sensuousness. The district is populated by various tribes and races who maintain their own dialect, culture, customs and way of living. Apart from various tribes, non-tribals also account for a sizable amount of the population. They are mostly government employees, traders, graziers living in urban and semi-urban area. The small and serene villages shelter the lovely people – warm and fascinating – and as colourful as the land itself.

The district is home to Dimasa Kacharis, Zeme Naga, Hmars, Kukis, Biates, Hrangkhol.

Judima is a very important brew made by Dimasa tribals used in ceremonies and festivals is very famous in this region. In sept 2021, Judima got GI tag by Government of India making it the first bree in northeastern part of India to bag this title.

Education
Average literacy rate of Dima Hasao in 2011 were 77.54% compared to 67.62% of 2001. All schools of Dima Hasao are run by the state government or private organisations. English is the primary languages of instruction in most of the schools. The schools are recognised either with Board of Secondary Education, Assam (SEBA), Assam Higher Secondary Education Council (AHSEC) or Central Board of Secondary Education (CBSE). All Colleges of Dima Hasao are affiliated to Assam University, a central university, which imparts education in both the general as well as professional streams.

College
 Haflong Government College, Haflong
 J.B Hagjer Junior College, Umrangso 
 B. Bodo Junior College, Maibang
 Hills Degree College, Haflong
 J.B Hagjer Memorial Junior College, Diyungbra
 Maibang Degree College, Maibang
 Sengya Sambudhan Junior College, Haflong
 M.C.D Junior College, Harangajao.

Schools
Prominent schools in the district:
Ever Green High School, Maibang
Vivekananda Kendra Vidyalaya,NEEPCO, Umrangso
Don Bosco Higher Secondary School, Haflong
Lower Haflong High School.
Trinity High School, Mahur
Vivekananda Kendriya Vidyalaya, Sarkari Bagan, Haflong
Mahur High School, Mahur
St. Agnes Convent Higher Secondary School, Dibarai, Haflong
Jawahar Navodaya Vidyalaya, Haflong
CHT Synod Higher Secondary School, Haflong
Tularam Memorial Good Shepherd School, Gunjung
Presbyterian High School, Mahur
Langting High School, Langting
HM St. Mary's High School, Langting
Prabananda Vidya Mandir, Maibang
Raja Gobindh Chandra Aarsh Gurukulum, Diyungbra
Royal Academy, Umrangso
Jamundadevi Saraswati School
 Sacred Heart High school, Umrangso
 Covenant High School, Bethel, Haflong

Tourism
Dima Hasao is a land with full of natural beauties. Beautiful hilly town Haflong, which is the only hill station of Assam. The village Jatinga is famous for mysterious suicides of birds. Some notable places of Dima Hasao are Umrangso, Panimur Falls, Maibang, Tumjang Trek at Selkal Peak etc.

Media

Television

Radio
 All India Radio, Akashvani Haflong broadcasts from Haflong at 100.02 megahertz on FM band.

Local newspapers
Haflong Khurang (Dimasa weekly)
Haflong Times (English weekly)
Dima Hasao Post (English weekly)
Agape (Hmar weekly)
Shoilo Prohori (Bengali Weekly)

See also
List of districts of Assam

References

External links 

 District Administration website

 
Districts of Assam
1970 establishments in Assam